"So Lonely" is a song by English rock band the Police, released as the third and final single in November 1978 from their debut studio album Outlandos d'Amour (1978), and again in February 1980 as a re-release. The song uses a reggae style, and featured Sting on lead vocals.

"So Lonely" has since been covered by a variety of artists, such as Limbeck and the Militia Group.

Background
Sting admitted that he used Bob Marley's "No Woman, No Cry" as the basis for this song:

Sting recycled the lyrics in the song's verses from his earlier Last Exit song "Fool in Love". The lyrics themselves, about someone who is lonely after getting his heart broken, were thought to be "ironic" to large audiences. Sting denied this claim, however, saying, "No, there's no irony whatsoever. From the outside it might look a bit strange, being surrounded by all this attention and yet experiencing the worst lonely feeling...but I do. And then suddenly the attention is withdrawn a half an hour later. You're so isolated..."

"So Lonely" was released as the third and final single from Outlandos d'Amour in November 1978, following "Roxanne" and "Can't Stand Losing You." The single did not chart on the first occasion but reached No. 6 with its second release. The other singles from Outlandos d'Amour followed a similar pattern of not charting very high in 1978, but doing very well on a re-release.

The video for the song depicts the band walking around the streets of Hong Kong and on the subway trains of Tokyo in 1980. The band lip-syncs into walkie-talkies, while Stewart Copeland performs drum fills on random objects, such as buses and objects being sold.

The B-Side "No Time This Time" was originally a non-album track, but the same recording later appeared on their album Reggatta de Blanc to pad out the short running time.

The song is known for a famous mondegreen where the title is often misheard as "Sue Lawley", a broadcaster famous as a BBC television newsreader at the time the song was released, and later for presenting Desert Island Discs on BBC Radio 4 from 1988 to 2006. The misunderstanding was ranked as the most frequently misheard lyric in a 2020 survey of UK adults.

Other appearances
The song has been covered many times, including a version by Limbeck on the album ¡Policia!: A Tribute to the Police (2005) put out by the Militia Group.

Personnel
Sting – bass, lead and backing vocals, harmonica
Andy Summers – guitars
Stewart Copeland – drums

Track listing
7-inch: A&M / AMS 7402 (UK)
 "So Lonely" – 3:10
 "No Time This Time" – 3:30

Charts

References

1978 singles
Songs about loneliness
Songs written by Sting (musician)
The Police songs
1978 songs
A&M Records singles